Hassan Chickmagalur Lok Sabha constituency is a former Lok Sabha constituency in Mysore State (Karnataka from 1952 to 1956).  This seat came into existence in 1951 and ceased to exist in 1956, before 1957 Lok Sabha Elections. This constituency was later merged with Hassan Lok Sabha constituency and later got spitted to Hassan and Chikmagalur Lok Sabha constituencies during 1967 Lok Sabha Elections. Major portion of Chikmagalur district got merged to Udupi Chikmagalur Lok Sabha constituency with the implementation of the delimitation of parliamentary constituencies in 2008.

Members of Parliament 
1951: H. Siddananjappa, Indian National Congress
1957 to 1966: Hassan Lok Sabha constituency.
1967 to 2008: Hassan Lok Sabha constituency and Chikmagalur Lok Sabha constituency.
2009 onwards: Hassan Lok Sabha constituency and Udupi Chikmagalur Lok Sabha constituency

Notes

See also
 Hassan Lok Sabha constituency
 Chikmagalur Lok Sabha constituency
 Udupi Chikmagalur Lok Sabha constituency
 Hassan district
 Chikmagalur district
 List of former constituencies of the Lok Sabha

Hassan district
Chikkamagaluru district
1956 disestablishments in India
Lok Sabha constituencies in Mysore
Former constituencies of the Lok Sabha
Constituencies disestablished in 1956
Former Lok Sabha constituencies of Karnataka